The 2015 Apia International Sydney was a joint 2015 ATP World Tour and 2015 WTA Tour tennis tournament, played on outdoor hard courts in Sydney, New South Wales. It was the 123rd edition of the tournament and took place at the NSW Tennis Centre in Sydney, Australia. It was held from 11 January through 17 January 2015 as part of the Australian Open Series in preparation for the first Grand Slam of the year.

Point distribution

Prize money

1Qualifiers prize money is also the Round of 32 prize money.
*per team

ATP singles main-draw entrants

Seeds 

1 Rankings as of January 5, 2015

Other entrants 
The following players received wildcards into the singles main draw:
  Juan Martín del Potro
  Sam Groth
  Marinko Matosevic

The following player received entry using a protected ranking into the singles main draw:
  Nicolás Almagro

The following players received entry from the qualifying draw:
  Mikhail Kukushkin
  Jarkko Nieminen
  Igor Sijsling
  Viktor Troicki

Withdrawals 
Before the tournament
  Marcel Granollers (knee injury) → replaced by  Simone Bolelli

ATP doubles main-draw entrants

Seeds 

1 Rankings as of January 5, 2015

Other entrants 
The following pairs received wildcards into the doubles main draw:
  James Duckworth /  Chris Guccione
  Nick Kyrgios /  Marinko Matosevic

WTA singles main-draw entrants

Seeds 

1 Rankings as of January 12, 2015.

Other entrants 
The following players received wildcards into the singles main draw:
  Jarmila Gajdošová 
  Daria Gavrilova

The following players received entry from the qualifying draw:
  Polona Hercog
  Kristina Mladenovic
  Tsvetana Pironkova
  Lesia Tsurenko

The following player received entry as a lucky loser:
  Nicole Gibbs

Withdrawals 
Before the tournament
  Simona Halep (gastrointestinal illness) → replaced by Nicole Gibbs

Retirements 
  Caroline Wozniacki (wrist injury)
  Madison Keys

WTA doubles main-draw entrants

Seeds 

1 Rankings as of January 12, 2015.

Other entrants 
The following pairs received wildcards into the doubles main draw:
  Belinda Bencic /  Lucie Šafářová
  Dominika Cibulková /  Jarmila Gajdošová
  Arina Rodionova /  Olga Savchuk

Finals

Men's singles 

  Viktor Troicki defeated  Mikhail Kukushkin, 6–2, 6–3

Women's singles 

  Petra Kvitová defeated  Karolína Plíšková, 7–6(7–5), 7–6(8–6)

Men's doubles 

  Rohan Bopanna /  Daniel Nestor defeated  Jean-Julien Rojer /  Horia Tecău, 6–4, 7–6(7–5)

Women's doubles 

  Bethanie Mattek-Sands /  Sania Mirza defeated  Raquel Kops-Jones /  Abigail Spears, 6–3, 6–3

References

External links 
 

 
Apia International Sydney, 2015